Baliospermum montanum (Sanskrit : हस्तिदंती Hastidanti), commonly known as red physic nut, wild castor, wild croton and wild sultan seed, is a plant in the family Euphorbiaceae. Baliospermum montanum  is a stout undershrub with numerous flowers.

Distribution
Baliospermum montanum is distributed throughout the sub-Himalayan tracts from Khasi Hills to Kashmir. It is common in  Bihar, West Bengal, and Peninsular and Central India.

Description
Baliospermum montanum is a stout under-shrub 0.9-1.8m in height with herbaceous branches from the roots. Leaves are simple, sinuate-toothed, upper ones small, lower ones large and sometimes palmately 3-5 lobed. Flowers are numerous, arranged in axillary racemes with male flowers above and a few females below. Fruits are capsules, 8- 13mm long and obovoid. Seeds are ellipsoid smooth and mottled.

Pharmacognosy and phytochemistry
Root in the medicinal part which is used in constipation, abdominal pain, general anasarca, piles, calculus, helminthic infections, scabies, dermic affections, suppurative ulcers and diseases caused by the morbidity of kapha and pitta. Root paste is applied to painful piles and swellings. Leaves are used in treatment of asthma and seeds are used in snakebite.

Antilukaemic and cytotoxic activities have been demonstrated in the esters of both 12-deoxyphorbol and 12-deoxy-16-hydroxyphorbol,
isolated from B. montanum.

Alcoholic extract of plant showed hypotensive activity in experimental animals. The stem is anti-dontalgic. The roots have the following properties:  purgative, tonic, anodyne, digestive, acrid, thermogenic, anthelmintic, diuretic, febrifuge, diaphoretic, rubefacient  and antiinflammatory. Seed is  rubefacient, stimulant, purgative, and antidote for snakebite and its oil is antirheumatic. Leaf is antiasthmatic and wound healing. Root and seed oil is cathartic and antidropsical.

The drug constitutes an important series of preparations like Dantyarishta, Kaisoraguggulu gulika, Dantiharitakileham, and others.

Several compounds have been isolated from this plant such as steroids, triterpenoids, diterpenes (baliospermin, montanin, phorbol-12-deoxy-13-O-palmitate, phorbol-12-deoxy-16-hydroxy-13-O-palmitate and phorbol-12-deoxy-5b-hydroxy-13-myristate) glycosides, saponins, alkaloids, flavanoids and phenolic compounds

References

Codiaeae
Flora of China
Flora of tropical Asia